The 1983 Philippine Basketball Association (PBA) All-Filipino Conference was the first conference of the 1983 PBA season. It started on March 6 and ended on April 24, 1983.

Format
The following format will be observed for the duration of the conference:
 One-round eliminations; 7 games per team. The top four teams after the eliminations will advance to the semifinals.  
 Semifinals will be just a single round robin affair with the four remaining teams and their won-loss records back to zero.
 The top two teams in the semifinals advance in the best-of-five finals series. The other two teams dispute the third-place trophy also in a best-of-five series.

Elimination round

Semifinals

Third place playoffs

Finals

References

PBA Philippine Cup
All-Filipino Conference